Gyula Kabos (19 March 1887, Budapest – 6 October 1941, New York) was a Hungarian actor and comedian, widely known for his comedic movie roles in the late 1930s.

Biography

Early years 

Kabos was born on 19 March 1887, in Budapest as Gyula Kann. After completing Elek Solymosi's acting school, he started acting in Szabadka (Subotica), where he worked until 1910 with a short interruption in 1906–07 when he lived in Zombor (Sombor). Szabadka granted him his first successes, his first successful forays into the world of theatre, and this is the town where he met his first great comedic partner, Gyula Gózon. Following his advice, he moved to Nagyvárad (Oradea) and lived there from 1910 to 1913. Later on, he remembered these years quite fondly. He was a well-known actor in town and had various comic adventures with his partner (which were released weekly in the town newspaper). He later moved to Budapest to play in different theatres, including the Király Színház, the Vígszínház, Pesti Kabaré, while trying, but ultimately failing to start an American-styled variety theatre in Nagyvárad (1919).

Career between 1919–1933 

In 1919 he marries Mária Puhalag, and adopts her daughter, Gabriella Surányi. They moved to Budapest, where his son István György Kabos was born. As directors discover his comedic talent, he gets more and more small roles, including one in the Vígszínház. While his appearances are met with high critical acclaim, the financial crisis of the country drew a shadow to the theatrical world, also reducing his appearances. However, this situation proved as an opportunity, as the renowned Fővárosi Művész Színház (the future Operettszínház) closed its doors, and a new search began for a director. Along with László Békeffi, his name was trusted enough that they got the job. But life as a manager proved to be hard as Kabos disapproved the high salaries of leading actors, resulting in numerous conflicts. Again, the new plays are met with high critical acclaim, but not with monetary success, so the theatre needs to pull out formerly played acts. Continuing work conflicts, the appearance of the first loud movies, and disinterest of the public eventually result in bankruptcy. While he already tried himself in numerous small, often experimental silent films during the 1910s, he disliked them, as he blamed them for the downfall of theatrical world.

After numerous attempts, he played the role of "Mátyás Schneider" in the sound film, Hyppolit, a lakáj (Hyppolit, the Butler) in 1931. The movie became one of the first movie success in Hungary, and along with its soundtrack, becoming one of the most-known cinematic work of the era. The success results in several other foreign-language movie roles. After a small detour in Vienna, trying to impress the Austrian public, he works again in Budapest from 1932. As the global financial crisis, and the more and more popular movies further decimate the Budapest theatre scene, his career is struggling again is small, low-paying roles, overshadowed by few remaining stars. As the Magyar Színház theatre offers him a few dramatic roles, he accepts them, and thereby returns in the front of larger audiences. After a few dramatic roles, he returns to his old light-hearted comedic character, to great success, also touring in Germany.

Comedian and movie star 

Beginning with Márciusi Mese (A March tale) he begins to like doing movies. After the 1934 premier of Meseautó (Dream Car), his other massive success, he is confronted with standing ovation. The sudden fame surprises Kabos, as he does not understand why a movie star should be famous (until then he had only watched a few scenes from his own work). In his numerous later film characters he plays the tragicomical small man in the hard years of the 30s, motivated by fear to carry out foolish acts. While the public believed he became a rich movie star, Kabos's financial situation remained dire, as he needed to pay the debts of his theatrical failure, and had to support his poor family, who did not believe that he was much like them. Even while being the most known comedy star, because of the creditors, he only got 10 Pengő from his original 60 Pengő/day payment (as comparison actress Sári Fedák got 540 Pengő/day). To get his livelihood, he needed to make movie after movie, while also playing numerous theatres. His role in the Vígszínház act Lovagias Ügy is another great success, winning back his theatrical audience. By 1935, he becomes one of the most sought-after movie actor, as he could greatly adapt to the then-special process of shooting only one scene at a time. Notable movies of this era are Halló Budapest and Köszönöm, hogy elgázolt.

Final years in Hungary 

In 1936 he completes the movie version of the Lovagias Ügy, which was the first to spark the opposition of the radical right-wing groups, that were starting a few years before. Protests, shouting "Down with Jewish movies" were held in Budapest, Pécs, Baja, and many premieres were disrupted. As historians believe, the growing number of such revolts were orchestrated from Germany. Kabos slowly becomes the center point of attacks, a condition that fills him with fear and despair, not only for himself, but for his family. He buries himself in work, whenever possible. The third big success, A Noszty fiú esete Tóth Marival is followed by a massive right-wing press campaign against director István Székely, after which he left the country. Losing one of his main partner in movie-making, Kabos fears he could be next. With budgets decreasing, Kabos, became more and more like a cornerstone of Hungarian filmmaking of the time, deciding the financial success or failure of the venture. In 1937 he leaves Vígszínház theatre, to act in the Andrássy and Magyar theatre. These are the months of his last bigger achievements, as air-raid sirens, the first signs of the coming WWII were disrupting the work more and more often.  In spring 1938 he starts to plan his escape. With the help of his old friend Alexander Korda, he sends his son István to England to university. After playing in three light comedies, his 33-year theatrical career in Budapest comes to a close. While he still continues to make movies, including his first real leading role in Papucshős, the first anti-Jew laws make his work slowly impossible. In 1939 newspapers began to spread rumors that Kabos is travelling to America. With his wife at his side, and in deep depression, he leaves the country in the compartment of a train leaving from the Keleti train station. Through Ostend and Dover they travel to London, where they meet their son István. On 1. February 1939, aboard the vessel Paris, they sail out towards America, to a future Kabos was uncertain about.

Life in America 

The pair moves into the Woodrow Hotel in New York, where they receive numerous contract offers from fellow countrymen living in the city. Kabos accepts the manager position of a small Hungarian troupe, but in letters he complained that his colleagues are without talent. They go for a 2-week long tour including Philadelphia, Trenton, Passaic. As he described, movie theatre owners tried to ruin their shows, and seats were half empty, even while admission prices were less than half the price of movie tickets. In April 1939 the group continued to tour in Chicago and Detroit, with Kabos making extra appearances, often 4 times a day. But even as such, earnings remained miserable. Their situation got worse when his wife was moved to a hospital with bile failure, needing an immediate operation, using up most of their spare money. Sándor Incze, a renowned theatrical figure also in exile, offers Kabos a role in New York, but after travelling there, he declines, partly after discovering that he doesn't speak the theatrical English language. While in Hungary, the attacks again him become more powerful, even questioning his nationality. By the summer of 1939, they start to run out of money. Kabos arranges a second tour with offhand groups, to mild success. He starts to build a small theatre room out of a restaurant run by his friend, but fails after one month. Playing in small acts once-twice a week, the couple gets enough money for basic food, otherwise they make walks in the Central Park. Kabos wrote a small book of his life, directed an amateur movie sketch to tour with, and a 3-hour revue, all failing. With the help of a friend, he gets a small role in one of the Broadway theatres, but had a heart attack on stage. His doctor orders him to stop going to rehearsals, but he refused. Barely surviving two other seizures, he is moved to a hospital, where, after lying in oxygen tent unconsciously for two weeks, dies on 6 October 1941.

Legacy 

The funeral was managed by Ferenc Göndör, an immigrant friend. The actor was buried in Cedar Park Cemetery in Emerson, New Jersey under the name 'Kobas'. His adopted daughter Gabriella received a scrambled telegram from his mother with the news of the death, but the country only knew of it after the official statement from the MTI on 9 October. By this time in Hungary, Kabos's movies were banned, most of his colleagues denied of work, and the country was in war for 3 months. Newspapers only wrote the fact of death, as war news were the most important.

After the war, the first copies of Kabos movies reappear for a short time, although most of them were lost during the battles. But the slowly established communist government thought them to be works of the aristocratic society of the past, and as such, not permitted for the working society – the copies were returned to their archival boxes, only to open up in the fifties and seventies, to short lived successes. The softening political situation of the 1980s allowed the reappearance of his cinematic work in movies and the National Television, and later cable stations, recapturing his former fame. He was reburied in the Farkasréti Cemetery in Budapest, in the presence of large crowds.

Filmography

Sources

  The life of Gyula Kabos on szineszkonyvtar.hu
  Gyula Kabos in the Hungarian Theatrical Lexicon, (György, Székely. Magyar Színházművészeti Lexikon. Budapest: Akadémiai Kiadó, 1994. ), freely available on mek.oszk.hu
 Tibor, Bános: Kabos Gyula Budapest: Athaneum, 2001.

External links
 Kabos memorial webpage
 Kabos memorial webpage
Kabos’ recordings on Gramofon Online 
 

1887 births
1941 deaths
Hungarian male film actors
Hungarian comedians
Hungarian Jews
Burials at Farkasréti Cemetery
Hungarian emigrants to the United States
20th-century comedians